Tampu Mach'ay or Tampumach'ay (Quechua tampu inn, guest house, mach'ay cave, "guest house cave", Hispanicized spelling Tambomachay) is an archaeological site in Peru. It is located in the Huancavelica Region, Tayacaja Province, Acostambo District.

See also 
 Inka Mach'ay
 Pirwayuq

References 

Archaeological sites in Peru
Archaeological sites in Huancavelica Region
Caves of Peru